Ernest Arthur Payne was an English professional footballer active in France in the 1930s and 1940s. Payne played club football with Excelsior Roubaix and Boulogne, and later managed Boulogne, Rouen and Roubaix-Tourcoing.

References

Year of birth missing
Year of death missing
English footballers
English football managers
Excelsior AC (France) players
US Boulogne players
US Boulogne managers
FC Rouen managers
Ligue 1 players
Ligue 2 players
CO Roubaix-Tourcoing managers
Association football defenders